Deon Earl Maurice Kipping (born April 9, 1979) is an American gospel musician. He started his music career, in 2006, with the release of, Real Life. Real Worship., by Love & Life Records. His second album, I Just Want to Hear You, was released in 2012 with Verity Records and RCA Inspiration. This album would chart on two Billboard charts Billboard 200 and the Gospel Albums chart.

Early life
Kipping was born on April 9, 1979, in Bridgeport, Connecticut, as Deon Earl Maurice Kipping.

Music career
His music career got started in 2006, with the release of Real Life. Real Worship. with Love & Life Records that was released on January 25, 2006. His second album, I Just Want to Hear You, was released on September 4, 2012 by Verity Records and RCA Inspiration. This was his breakthrough released on the Billboard charts, and it placed at No. 127 on Billboard 200 along with Gospel Albums at No. 6. Steve Leggett, at AllMusic, recognizes the album "shows the same clear and warm production polish", and Cross Rhythms' Darren Matthews rated the album a seven out of ten realizing, "Deon steps up to the mic to bring us a competent blend of old and new gospel sounds."

Discography

References

External links
 Official website

1979 births
Living people
African-American songwriters
African-American Christians
Musicians from Bridgeport, Connecticut
Songwriters from Connecticut
Songwriters from New York (state)
21st-century African-American people
20th-century African-American people